Kushti is a 2010 Indian sports comedy film directed by T. K. Rajeev Kumar. The film stars Rajpal Yadav in the lead role, along with the WWE wrestler The Great Khali (Dalip Singh Rana) making his Bollywood debut. The film also stars Manoj Joshi, Om Puri and Sharat Saxena in supporting roles. The film is a remake of the 1985 Malayalam film Mutharamkunnu P. O.

Plot 
The film Kushti is the story of a small village in Northern India where wrestling is a popular sport and an important wrestling match is held every year. Every year rivals Avtar Singh and Jiten Singh try to beat each other in the wrestling match and gain the trusteeship of the village. Chander plays the role of a village simpleton and a post-master.

It filled with misunderstandings and misconceptions, of hidden identities and secret love-affairs and the outcome is simply hilarious. The movie begins to take a turn when a certain someone delivers a secret package in the wrong hands. Especially someone, who is bound to take advantage and manipulate the real owner of the package.

Avtar Singh has a young and a beautiful daughter named Laadli, with who Chander is madly in love. To get her father's approval for their marriage he was to first prove his prowess by wrestling with the 7 and half feet tall "Rama Krishna". The condition set by Avtar Singh is that Chander has to defeat "Khali" in the wrestling match

Cast 
Rajpal Yadav as  Chander
Dalip Singh Rana as Himself
Nargis Bagheri as Laadli
Sharat Saxena as Avtar Singh
Asrani as Janak Lal
Manoj Joshi as Kripashankar
Om Puri as Jiten Singh
Jagadeesh as Puncher Pappu
Razak Khan as Chander's friend
Ramesh Pisharody as Sinterklaas 
Asif Basra as Duliya ram (Post Master)

Soundtrack 
The music of Kushti is composed by Srinivas, Tauseef Akhtar, AD Boyz and Hriju Roy. The lyrics were done by Sameer. The movie has 5 original songs.

Critical reception
Kushti received mixed reviews, but mostly negative. The  total gross came up to about 3.5/5 score. The song "Rang Rasiya" was praised a lot, which helped the film from going down even lower in business.

References

External links
 
Kushti (Full Profile @ BollywoodHungama)
Kushti's First-Look

2010 films
2010s Hindi-language films
Indian sports comedy films
Films scored by Sharreth
Films scored by Srinivas
2010s sports comedy films
Hindi remakes of Malayalam films
Sport wrestling films
Films directed by T. K. Rajeev Kumar
2010 comedy films